Bill Stevens (8 June 1908 – 11 August 1981) was an  Australian rules footballer who played with North Melbourne in the Victorian Football League (VFL).

Notes

External links 

1908 births
1981 deaths
Australian rules footballers from Victoria (Australia)
North Melbourne Football Club players